The women's 12.5 kilometre mass start at the 2017 Asian Winter Games was held on February 26, 2017 at the Nishioka Biathlon Stadium.

Schedule
All times are Japan Standard Time (UTC+09:00)

Results
Legend
DNS — Did not start

 Fuyuko Tachizaki was awarded bronze because of no three-medal sweep per country rule.

References

Results

External links
Official website

Women mass start